Body Lasher is the debut album of Daddy Freddy ("The D.J. Chemist") on the Sunset label. The album was pressed to 12" vinyl for release.

Track listing
"Miraculous" - 3:43
"Body Lasher" - 3:55
"In a Me Prime" - 3:46
"Jah Jah We Need" - 3:44
"Look How We Neat" - 4:01
"Some Girl a Model" - 3:43
"Get Fat" - 3:25
"Born Christian" - 3:59
"Zoo Party" - 3:14

References

Daddy Freddy albums
1986 debut albums